This is a list of previous winners of the Blackrock Rugby Festival, which was established in 1983. Rift Valley Academy holds the most titles of any school at 12 titles, the most of any school.

The Main Cup had been competed for by all teams since 1983, but from 2000, it was decided that the top team of each group would qualify for the quarter-finals of the Main Cup, while the second and third-placed team of each group would qualify for the quarter-finals of the Plate and Bowl Cup respectively.

In 2022, the competition was played in a seven-a-side format instead of the regular fifteen-a-side format.

Main cup

Plate Cup

Bowl Cup

Blackrock Rugby Festival
Sport in Nairobi
High school rugby union